FK Tempo Partizánske is a Slovak football team, based in the town of Partizánske. The club was founded in 1940. Club colors are red and white. FK Tempo Partizánske home stadium is Štadión Karola Jokla with a capacity of 1,500 spectators.

Current squad

Staff

Current technical staff

Historical names
 FK Tempo Partizánske (?–present)

External links 

  
  

Football clubs in Slovakia
Association football clubs established in 1940
1940 establishments in Slovakia